Mark Alan Hutchison (born May 5, 1963) is an American attorney and politician who served as the 34th lieutenant governor of Nevada from 2015 to 2019. He was elected to the Nevada State Senate on November 6, 2012, to represent Senate District 6, which encompasses the Northwest part of the Las Vegas Valley, including portions of the communities of Summerlin, Desert Shores and Sun City. He is a member of the Republican Party. As a state senator, Hutchison served on the Senate Judiciary Committee, as well as the Commerce, Labor and Energy Committee.

Hutchison was sworn into office as Lieutenant Governor on January 4, 2015, for a four-year term, which ended January 7, 2019. Hutchison ran for Lieutenant Governor of Nevada in the 2014 election and defeated Democrat Lucy Flores. Hutchison served as a member of Governor Brian Sandoval's cabinet and was the President of the State Senate. He also served as the Chairman of the Nevada Commission on Tourism, Vice-chairman of the Nevada Board of Transportation, a member of the Nevada Board of Economic Development, and a member of the Nevada Commission on Homeland Security and the Chairman of its subcommittee on Cyber Security.

Hutchison announced that he is not running for Nevada Governor in 2022 and became campaign chairman for Clark County Sheriff Joe Lombardo's gubernatorial campaign.  In January 2022 The Church of Jesus Christ of Latter-day Saints announced that he would be serving as church Virginia Richmond mission president instead beginning service in July 2022.

Early and personal life
Hutchison was born in Las Vegas, Nevada, in 1963. He graduated from Bonanza High School (Las Vegas) in 1981, and then attended the University of Nevada, Las Vegas, graduating in 1987 with a Bachelor of Science in business administration, with high distinction (Phi Kappa Phi). Hutchison received his Juris Doctor degree in 1990 from Brigham Young University's J. Reuben Clark Law School (magna cum laude) where he earned the high academic distinction of the Order of the Coif and served as lead-articles editor of the law review. Following law school, Hutchison clerked for Kenneth F. Ripple of the United States Court of Appeals for the Seventh Circuit located in Chicago. After his clerkship, he practiced for the national law firm of Kirkland & Ellis in both Chicago and Los Angeles. Hutchison is currently licensed to practice law in Nevada and California. In addition, he is a member of several federal and state bars, including the U.S. Supreme Court Bar.

Hutchison lives in Las Vegas, Nevada, with his wife, Cary. They have six children (Whitney, Canton, Kelsey, Weston, Logan, and Sophie) and four grandchildren. He is an active member of the Church of Jesus Christ of Latter-day Saints. In January, 2022 it was announced that he would be serving as Virginia Richmond mission president for this church beginning July, 2022.

Law career
Hutchison founded the law firm of Hutchison & Steffen with his friend and professional colleague, John T. Steffen, in 1996. Hutchison's primary practice areas are business and complex tort litigation, constitutional litigation and professional liability defense.

State Senate
Hutchison was elected to a four-year term in the Nevada State Senate in 2012, representing District 6 in Las Vegas, Nevada, which encompasses the Northwest part of the Las Vegas Valley, including portions of the communities of Summerlin, Desert Shores and Sun City. During the 77th Session of the Nevada Legislative (2013), Hutchison served on the Senate Judiciary Committee and the Senate Commerce, Labor and Energy Committee.

In 2014, the Las Vegas Sun reported that Hutchinson failed to disclose a $15,000 all-expenses-paid trip to Israel in 2013, hosted by the American Israel Education Foundation, the educational arm of the American Israel Public Affairs Committee.

77th regular session (2013)
 Senate Committee on Judiciary
 Senate Committee on Commerce, Labor and Energy

Electoral history

State Senate (6th District)

2012

Lieutenant Governor

References

External links
 
 
 

|-

1963 births
20th-century American lawyers
21st-century American lawyers
21st-century American politicians
Latter Day Saints from Nevada
Lieutenant Governors of Nevada
Living people
J. Reuben Clark Law School alumni
People associated with Kirkland & Ellis
Nevada lawyers
Republican Party Nevada state senators
Politicians from Las Vegas
University of Nevada, Las Vegas alumni